Arsen Goulamirian (born 4 October 1987) is an Armenian-born French professional boxer who has held the WBA cruiserweight title since 2019.

Professional career

Early career
Arsen turned professional in 2011 and won 14 consecutive fights before winning the WBA Continental (Europe) cruiserweight title. He would improve his record to 22–0 before getting a shot at the vacant Regular WBA cruiserweight title against Ryad Merhy. Arsen would end up winning the fight via 11th round stoppage and became the interim WBA cruiserweight champion.

WBA Interim Cruiserweight champion

Goulamirian vs. Merhy
Goulamirian was scheduled to face the undefeated WBA Inter-Continental cruiserweight titlist Ryad Merhy for the vacant WBA interim cruiserweight title. The bout was set as the main event of the 24 March 2018, Canal+ card held at the Palais des Sports in Marseille, France. Goulamirian was at the time the #1 ranked WBA cruiserweight contender, while Merhy was the #2 ranked contender in the WBA rankings. Goulamirian won the fight by a technical knockout, stopping Merhy with a combination of unanswered strikes in the eleventh round, after dominating the fight from the very first round.

The WBA changed Goulamirian's status from Regular to Interim, when former champion Beibut Shumenov came back from his eye injury and recovered the Regular WBA cruiserweight title by defeating Turkish Hizni Altunkaya on 7 July 2018.

Goulamirian vs. Flanagan
After capturing the interim WBA strap, Goulamirian was scheduled to face the one-time WBA cruiserweight super title challenger Mark Flanagan. The bout was once again scheduled as the main event of a Canal+ card, held on 20 October 2018, at the Palais des Sports in Marseille, France. Flanagan was ranked #10 by the WBA at cruiserweight. Goulamirian kept his undefeated record, winning the fight by a ninth-round technical knockout. The two fighters were on even footing for the first three rounds, but Flanagan began to tire from the fourth round onward, with a notable drop in his output. Flanagan was knocked down twice in the ninth round, with his corner deciding to throw in the towel after the second knockdown.

WBA Cruiserweight champion

Promotion to Super champion
On 14 February 2019, it was revealed that Goulamirian would challenge the reigning WBA Regular champion Beibut Shumenov. As the two camps were unable to agree on the terms of the bout, Goulamirian's promoter Sébastien Acariès and Shumenov's promoter Don King both submitted bids for the fight. King won after submitting a winning bid of $821 000, for the proposed WBA "Regular" cruiserweight title fight. King tried to put the fight together on three separate dates and locations, on 13 April in Monaco, on 20 April in Kazakhstan and 13 May in New York, but all three attempts fell through. Shumenov later developed respiratory issues, which left him unable to fight for the foreseeable future. Accordingly, the WBA stripped Shumenov of his Regular title and promoted Goulamirian in his place.

On 8 June 2019, the WBA called for a 20 June purse bid to grant the promotional rights for a WBA Super title match between the reigning champion Denis Lebedev and regular champion Goulamirian. The minimum bid was $200 000, with a 75% split for Lebedev and 25% for Goulamirian. The purse bid was later suspended as both sides reached an agreement to finalize the fight. On 11 July 2019, Lebedev announced his retirement from the sport. On 20 July 2019, Goulamirian was elevated to the status of WBA Super Cruiserweight champion.

Goulamirian vs. Watts, Bejenaru
Goulamirian was scheduled to make the first defense of his WBA Super title against the reigning WBA Oceania cruiserweight champion Kane Watts. Watts was ranked #11 by the WBA at cruiserweight. The bout was scheduled as the co-main event to the Michel Soro and Cedric Vitu super welterweight clash, held on 15 November 2019, at the AccorHotels Arena in Paris, France. Goulamirian was the overwhelming betting favorite heading into the bout, with Ouest-France describing the fight as "a formality for Goulamirian". Goulamirian made quick work of his overmatched opponent, knocking him out with a left hook to the body at the 1:08 minute mark of the fourth round.

Goulamirian was scheduled to make his second WBA Super title defense against the undefeated Constantin Bejenaru in the main event of a Canal+ card held at the Palais des Sports in Marseille, France, on 28 December 2019. Bejenaru was ranked #8 by the WBA at cruiserweight. Goulamirian won the fight by a tenth-round stoppage. Referee Oliver Brien called in the ringside doctor after the ninth round, due to the amount of damage that Bejenaru suffered up to that point. After consulting with the physician, the referee decided to stop the fight. Goulamirian was leading on all three of the judges scorecards at that point, with scores of 87-83, 87-83, and 86-84.

Goulamirian  vs. Egorov
On 12 February 2021, the WBA ordered Goulamirian to make a mandatory title defense against Aleksey Egorov. They were given a 30-day negotiation period, starting with 11 February 2021. As the two camps were unable to come to terms, the WBA ordered a purse bid to be held on 23 August, with a 65% split for Goulamirian as Super Champion, and 35% split for Egorov as holder of the Gold title. World of Boxing won with a $210 000 bid, which was the only one submitted. The fight was eventually scheduled for 10 December 2021, at the RCC Boxing Academy in Yekaterinburg, Russia. Goulamirian was later forced to withdraw from the bout, as he tested positive for COVID-19.

On 19 July 2022, Goulamirian was ordered by the WBA to face the "Regular" cruiserweight champion Ryad Merhy in a title unification bout, which would leave only a single recognized WBA world champion in the division. Both fighters were given 24 hours to advise the WBA if they would be to fight in 30 days. The winner of the fight would furthermore be ordered to make a mandatory defense against Alexey Egorov within 90 days of winning the title, but only if the Russo-Ukrainian War had concluded by then. Merhy delivered his letter of resignation to the WBA on 12 August, in which he stated that he would not be fighting Goulamirian, and was furthermore vacating his Regular cruiserweight title.

On 23 August 2022, the WBA once again ordered Goulamirian to make a mandatory title defense against the former "Gold" champion Aleksey Egorov, and assigned a 15-day negotiation period, before a purse bid would be called. A purse bid was called as they failed to reach an agreement, which was won by Y2 Boxing who bid $364,000. The bout took place at the La Palestre in Le Cannet, France on 19 November 2022. Goulamirian won the fight by unanimous decision, with two scorecards of 116–112 and one scorecard of 117–111. WBA Regular world champion Ryad Merhy was stripped of his title on 12 August 2022, which left Goulamirian as the sole WBA titleholder at the weight.

Professional boxing record

See also
List of cruiserweight boxing champions

References

External links

Arsen Goulamirian - Profile, News Archive & Current Rankings at Box.Live

1987 births
Living people
Cruiserweight boxers
World cruiserweight boxing champions
World Boxing Association champions
French male boxers
Armenian male boxers
French people of Armenian descent